Slievemore is the second highest peak on Achill Island after Croaghaun, in County Mayo, Ireland.  Its elevation is 671 m (2,201 ft).

Archaeology
In 1991, the Achill Archaeological Field School was opened. That year, the Deserted Village Project was created to perform archaeology excavations in Slievemore.

See also
Lists of mountains in Ireland

References

External links
 mountain views.ie
 

Achill Island
Hewitts of Ireland
Marilyns of Ireland
Mountains and hills of County Mayo
Special Areas of Conservation in the Republic of Ireland
Mountains under 1000 metres